Cole Turner may refer to:

 Cole Turner (American football) (born 2000), American football player
 Cole Turner (soccer) (born 2001), American soccer player
 Cole Turner (Charmed), fictional character in the American TV series Charmed